Events in the year 2021 in Monaco.

Incumbents 
 Monarch: Albert II
 Minister of State (Monaco): Pierre Dartout

Events 

Ongoing – COVID-19 pandemic in Monaco

 21–24 January – 2021 Monte Carlo Rally.
 14 September – Raphaël Domjan became the first pilot of an electric plane flight with a head of state. They took off with a Pipistrel Velis128 operated by Elektropostal from Nice airport in France with Albert II and they flew over Monaco. The plane flew for 30 minutes at a maximum altitude of 900 feet.

Deaths

See also 

 COVID-19 pandemic in Europe
 2021 in the European Union
 City states

References 

 
2020s in Monaco
Years of the 21st century in Monaco
Monaco
Monaco